Pasir Ris Group Representation Constituency was a four member Group Representation Constituency (GRC) that locates in the eastern part of Singapore at Pasir Ris. It had only existed once in 1997 general election. This GRC was created from the wards of Pasir Ris and parts of Tampines North from the defunct Eunos Group Representation Constituency

In 2001 General Election, this GRC had absorbed 3 wards in Punggol areas, while 3 of the existing 4 member wards in Pasir Ris was consolidated into 2 wards. With such enlargement, this GRC was renamed into Pasir Ris–Punggol GRC and expands to a 5 members GRC. Since then, it has again further expanded to 6 members GRC on 2006 General Election which the arrangement existed until 2020.

Members of Parliament

Candidates and results

Elections on 1990s

See also
Pasir Ris–Punggol GRC

References

1997 General Election's result

Singaporean electoral divisions
Pasir Ris